= Said Aboulrich =

- Born: Beirut, Lebanon
- Occupations: Singer; songwriter
- Years active: 2011–present
- Musical career
- Genre: Pop
- Instruments: Vocals, Guitar, drums, banjo, violin, harmonica, accordion, synthesizer
- Label: Ajami Records
- Website: facebook.com/SaidAboulrich

Said Aboulrich (Arabic: سعيد ابوالريش), is a Lebanese singer, musician, and songwriter. whose diverse vocal ability and style has attracted a following from different countries in the Arab world. Aboulrich started his music career at a young age; in 2011 he released his first single Am Tesa'al Ala min.

== Discography ==
=== Singles ===
- Am Tesa'al Ala min (2011)
- Alemni Ekrahak (2017)

== Videography ==
Official music videos
Year	Title	Album	Director
2017	Aalemni Ikrahak	Single	Adel Serhan
2006	Habytak	Single	Adel Serhan
